Okto is a daily children's program block on Mediacorp's Channel 5. The block airs daily during 5's morning and midafternoon time slots. It is also a weekend Mandarin children's program block on Mediacorp's Channel 8. It airs every weekend from 9am to 11am.

The Okto brand was introduced as a Singaporean standalone free-to-air television channel. A replacement of the Kids and Arts segments of Central, the channel aired mostly children's programmes, as well as some arts and sports programmes. The channel's target audiences were children ages 2–13, and adults ages 18–39. Okto ceased as a separate channel on 1 May 2019, due to lack of viewership.

History

Predecessors (1995-2008) 
Premiere 12 was launched on 1 September 1995, following the split of Channel 12 into it and Prime 12. The channel broadcast on a separate  UHF frequency (Channel 12's frequency and channel space was occupied by Prime 12, now Suria). Premiere 12 also included children's TV series (mainly for a preschooler audience) and sports coverage. Premiere 12 later included Tamil-language series and was rebranded as Central, on 30 January 2000.

Central's programming schedule was composed of three timeshared channels: Kids Central, focused on kids' programming; Vasantham Central, a Tamil-language programming block; and Arts Central centred on cultural programming.

Okto channel (2008-2019) 
On 19 October 2008, Central was dissolved. Vasantham Central on-air time was extended to form Vasantham, an independent channel focused on the Indian community of Singapore, as announced on 29 February that year by then Senior Minister of State for Information, Communications and the Arts Dr. Balaji Sadasivan in Parliament. Meanwhile, Kids Central and Arts Central were merged into a single channel named Okto, on a frequency and channel space formerly occupied by Channel i.

On 4 May 2015, the channel began airing in HD.

As Channel 5's kids block 
At midnight of 1 May 2019, Okto ceased transmission as a separate kids and sports channel due to lack of viewership, as announced on 20 February that year. The current Okto and OktoSports programming were split upon shutdown: children shows were merged into Channel 5's morning and midday schedule (replacing show reruns and morning bulletin simulcasts from CNA) under the Okto on 5 branding, and sports content were absorbed primarily to Mediacorp's over-the-top service MeWatch and Channel 5 for selected sports coverages. Okto's channel license was surrendered to the Infocomm Media Development Authority (IMDA) a few days later.

As Channel 8's kids block 
On 6 February 2021, Channel 8's children's programming block '乐乐窝' (Lè Lè Wō) has been rebranded as 'Okto尽在8' (Okto on 8), using an identical graphic package like 5's but with some minor changes.

Programming
Since its standalone channel era, Okto mostly aired English language-produced series with selected shows being broadcast in their original language. The channel's programming consisted of children's TV series, documentaries, lifestyle, anime, and art performances.

From June 2014 to 30 April 2019, Sports on Okto (later renamed as OktoSports) was introduced which showed sporting events live as well as recorded and delayed coverage.

See also

 Channel i
 Vasantham
 Central
 TVMobile

References 

2008 establishments in Singapore
2019 disestablishments in Singapore
Television stations in Singapore
Mass media in Singapore
Mediacorp
Television channels and stations established in 2008
Television channels and stations disestablished in 2019